The Dhofar toad or Oman toad (Duttaphrynus dhufarensis) is a species of toad in the family Bufonidae. It is endemic to the Arabian Peninsula and is found in Oman, Saudi Arabia, the United Arab Emirates, and Yemen.

Description
The Dhofar toad is a small species and is quite variable in appearance, being greenish or some shade of brown and either uniformly coloured or mottled and speckled with darker markings. The tympanum, just behind and below the bulging eyes, is large, which contrasts with the Arabian toad, the only other amphibian with which it is likely to be confused, which has a small tympanum. The call of the male at breeding time is a sharp "kra-kra-kra", and this contrasts with the "rusty hinge" sound made by the Arabian toad. The latter is less likely to be found far away from water bodies.

Distribution and habitat
One of only nine species of amphibian in the Arabian Peninsula, the Dhofar toad is found in Yemen, Oman, Saudi Arabia and the United Arab Emirates. Its typical habitat is wet places, springs, pools, streams, canals, ditches, irrigated land, gardens and oases, but it is sometimes found far from any permanent water.

Biology

This toad is largely nocturnal and feeds mostly on insects. It reacts to drought conditions by burying itself in the ground and aestivating, which it has been known to do for up to three years. When heavy rain falls, it emerges to feed and makes its way to nearby water bodies where the males call to attract the females. The eggs are laid in strings and the tadpoles develop with great rapidity before the ephemeral water sources dry up.

Status
The International Union for Conservation of Nature has assessed this toad's conservation status as being of "least concern" on the basis of its "wide distribution, tolerance of a degree of habitat modification, presumed large population, and because it is unlikely to be declining fast enough to qualify for listing in a more threatened category."

References

dhufarensis
Amphibians of the Middle East
Vertebrates of the Arabian Peninsula
Taxa named by Hampton Wildman Parker
Amphibians described in 1931
Taxonomy articles created by Polbot
Endemic fauna of Oman
Endemic fauna of Saudi Arabia
Endemic fauna of the United Arab Emirates
Endemic fauna of Yemen